Preguiça may refer to the following places:

 Preguiça, part of the town Espargos on the island of Sal, Cape Verde
 Preguiça, São Nicolau, a village on the island of São Nicolau, Cape Verde
 Preguiça River in northeastern Brazil